is a private Roman Catholic women's junior college in Yokohama, Kanagawa, Japan, established in 1966. It concentrates on French and English foreign language studies.

External links
  

Educational institutions established in 1966
Private universities and colleges in Japan
Universities and colleges in Yokohama
Japanese junior colleges
Catholic universities and colleges in Japan
Women's universities and colleges in Japan
1966 establishments in Japan